Benthophiloides brauneri is a species of goby, a benthophilic fish native to the fresh and brackish waters of the Black Sea, the Caspian Sea and the Sea of Azov as well as their surrounding rivers and estuaries. Despite the wide distribution, very few observations overall of this fish exist, and just one from the Caspian basin. Males of this species can reach a length of  SL while females only reach  SL. This fish only lives for one year.

References

External links

 Freshwater Ecoregions of the World 2009 
 Fishes of the waters of Ukraine (in Russian)

Benthophiloides
Fish of the Black Sea
Freshwater fish of Europe
Fish of Europe
Fish described in 1927
Taxonomy articles created by Polbot